Robinson: 2009, was the tenth version of Robinson, or Survivor as it is referred to in some countries, to air in Sweden and it premiered on 21 March 2009 and was the first season of the show to air since the show's initial cancellation in 2005. As a twist this season there were initially no tribes, instead contestants had to earn a spot on a tribe by surviving a challenge and the first tribal council. Another twist was that some of the contestants would have to compete in duels in order to avoid elimination. Ellenor Pierre eventually went on to win the season with a jury vote of 4–3 over Jarmo Heinonen.

Finishing order

Voting history

 In part one of episode six, the tribes were voting for who should take part in the elimination duel.
 At both the sixth and seventh tribal councils, Ellenor was not permitted to vote as she had finished last at the immunity challenge.
 At the tenth tribal council, Erik Bl and Nina were not permitted and were the only ones eligible to be voted for as the other three contestants had won semi-final challenges.

Season summary
One tribe (Pagang) kept losing and was decimated to three people come merge. On the winning tribe (Makal), four men formed an alliance. Old man Jarmo was on the outs socially and was not included in the alliance. Knowing that Jarmo would flip, the four-man alliance knew they needed six votes to have majority after the merge. Therefore, they invited the two women of the tribe, Ellenor and Nina. They were rather clear with the women that they were number five and six and would be voted off come final six. Ellenor seemed content with that. Just before the merge, each tribe had to vote for one member to do an elimination duel. Erik and Jarmo faced off in a nine-hour stamina challenge sitting in cages. Erik eventually fell asleep and lost. Jarmo was given an immunity idol which was good for the next tribal council. After the merge, Jarmo allied with the three remaining members of the losing tribe, as expected, but that still left them in minority: The three from old Pagang + Jarmo vs the four men from Makal + Ellenor + Nina. However, Ellenor finished last in the first individual immunity challenge and therefore lost her vote at the first tribal council. Jarmo then showed Nina his immunity idol to sway her. Nina knew she was on the bottom of the alliance and unlike Ellenor, she was not content with finishing 6th, so she took the opportunity and flipped. Therefore, the four-man alliance was eliminated one by one. Ellenor, also part of that alliance, was next in line. She had finished last in every individual immunity challenge so no one saw her as a threat, even though every jury member would likely vote for her since she had remained loyal to them. The final spots were decided by challenges and Ellenor won both rounds. Jarmo won the last challenge but he stood no chance against Ellenor with a jury of her former allies. The vote ended 4–3.

External links
http://www.worldofbigbrother.com
http://www.alltomtv.se/f100.html

 2009
2009 Swedish television seasons